Al-Taybah al-Gharbiyah (also spelled Teiba or Tayibeh al-Gharbiyeh) is a town in central Syria, administratively part of the Homs Governorate, northwest of Homs. Nearby localities include al-Shinyah to the southwest, al-Qabu to the south, Sharqliyya to the southeast, Taldou to the east, Kafr Laha and Tell Dahab to the northeast, Qarmas and Aqrab to the north, Qasraya to the northwest and Khunayzir to the west. According to the Central Bureau of Statistics (CBS), al-Taybah al-Gharbiyah had a population of 4,086 in the 2004 census. Its inhabitants today are predominantly Sunni Muslims.

In 1829, during Ottoman rule, the village consisted of 33 feddans and paid 3,190 qirsh in annual tax revenues. In 1838 al-Taybah al-Gharbiyah's inhabitants were reported to be Alawites by English scholar Eli Smith.

References

Bibliography

 

Populated places in Homs District